Mohamed Ali Ould Sidi Mohamed was the Minister of Energy and Oil of Mauritania under the transitional military regime that led the country from August 2005 to April 2007.

References

Living people
Government ministers of Mauritania
Year of birth missing (living people)
Place of birth missing (living people)
Energy ministers of Mauritania
21st-century Mauritanian politicians